Hoppy-Go-Lucky is a 1952 Warner Bros. Looney Tunes short film directed by Robert McKimson. The short was released on August 9, 1952, and stars Sylvester and Hippety Hopper.

Plot
The cartoon spoofs the 1937 book Of Mice and Men by John Steinbeck, which was popular at the time; it features a giant, dimwitted cat named "Benny", who wants Sylvester, whom he calls "George", to help him catch a mouse to "hug and pet." Mel Blanc voices Sylvester and Stan Freberg voices Benny.

References

1952 animated films
1952 short films
Looney Tunes shorts
Warner Bros. Cartoons animated short films
Films directed by Robert McKimson
1950s Warner Bros. animated short films
Of Mice and Men
1952 films
Sylvester the Cat films
Animated films about kangaroos and wallabies
1950s English-language films
Hippety Hopper films